Albert William Roberts (20 August 1909 – 13 May 1978) was a New Zealand Test cricketer who played in five Tests from 1930 to 1937.

Career as a batsman
Roberts made his first-class debut in 1927–28 at the age of 18 as a middle-order batsman for Canterbury. In 1929–30 he made 38 (top score) and 23 against the touring MCC, then after making 54, 70, 76 and 24 not out in his next two matches he was selected for New Zealand's first Test. However, he made only 3 and 5 and was one of several players left out of the side for the next Test.

He scored his first century in 1930–31 against Wellington, when his 116 helped turn a 127-run first-innings deficit into a 139-run victory. In the 1931–32 Plunket Shield season he scored 378 runs at 75.60, including 181 in 260 minutes against Wellington, when he added 278 in 220 minutes for the fourth wicket with Curly Page. The partnership set a new record for any wicket in the Plunket Shield. Roberts played in both Tests against South Africa at the end of the season, making 54 in the First Test.

He also played rugby union for Canterbury.

Career as an all-rounder
His form fell away in 1932–33 and he did not play in the Tests against England. He spent the 1933 English season playing as a professional for Church in the Lancashire League, scoring 615 runs at 26.73 and taking 59 wickets with his medium-pace bowling at 14.72. Thereafter he played as an all-rounder. In 1935–36 he played in three of the four (non-Test) matches for New Zealand against the touring MCC side, batting at seven or eight and opening the bowling. In the match in Wellington he made the top score of 75 not out, then took 3 for 33 and 3 for 39 as MCC narrowly avoided defeat.

He toured England in 1937, making 510 runs at 24.28 and taking 62 wickets at 26.20. In the Tests he led the batting averages with 142 runs at 47.33, with a top score of 66 not out in the First Test, and took seven wickets at 29.85. He missed the second of the three Tests with a shoulder injury. Wisden described him as "an extremely useful member of the side, especially as he was a brilliant slip. Moreover he had a way of getting runs when they were wanted".

Playing for Riccarton in senior Christchurch cricket in March 1938 he scored 214 not out in a little over two hours, with 10 sixes and 24 fours. He continued to play for Canterbury, then after World War II he played for Otago, continuing until the age of 41. He scored his third and last first-class century against Canterbury in 1946–47, when he saved the match for Otago with 44 and 110 not out. At the time of his retirement he held the record for the number of Plunket Shield matches played: 44.

Assessment
Dick Brittenden called him a "diverting mass of contradictions": "He took his magnificent athletic slip catches, he could hit with primitive force, and when he bowled, his out-swinger whipped away like a live thing. Yet he always looked tired, half asleep, absolutely casual and relaxed."

Personal life
On 11 January 1939 Roberts married Jean McLeod at St Paul's Church, Christchurch.

See also
 List of Otago representative cricketers

References

External links
 Alby Roberts at CricketArchive
 

1909 births
1978 deaths
New Zealand Test cricketers
New Zealand cricketers
Canterbury cricketers
Otago cricketers
Canterbury rugby union players